Antonio Muñoz and Manuel Orantes were the defending champions, but did not participate this year.

Wojtek Fibak and Jan Kodeš won the title, defeating Milan Holeček and Karl Meiler 7–5, 6–3 in the final.

Seeds

  Ilie Năstase /  Guillermo Vilas (quarterfinals)
  Jürgen Fassbender /  Hans-Jürgen Pohmann (semifinals)
  Wojtek Fibak /  Jan Kodeš (champions)
  Milan Holeček /  Karl Meiler (final)

Draw

Draw

External links
Draw

Doubles